Mehdi Badrlou is an Iranian footballer who plays for Saipa in the IPL.

Club career
Badrlou joined  Saba Qom in 2011 after spending the previous season with Aluminium Hormozgan in the Azadegan League. He joined Foolad Khuzestan in 2013 and won the Iran Pro League title in the same season. He joined Saipa

Club career statistics

References

External sources
 Profile at Persianleague
 

Living people
Saba players
Aluminium Hormozgan F.C. players
Foolad FC players
Iranian footballers
1986 births
Association football midfielders